is a Japanese marathon runner.

At the 2009 World Championships in Athletics held in Berlin, Germany, Fujiwara finished 61st in the men's marathon in a time of two hours, thirty-one minutes and ten seconds.

He represented Japan at the 2012 Summer Olympics in the men's marathon, finishing in 45th place. He qualified for the Games by finishing second in the 2012 Tokyo Marathon.

Personal Bests
5000 metres – 13:49.70 (2007)
10,000 metres – 28:57.28 (2007)
20K run – 58:25 (2012)
Half marathon – 1:01:34 (2012)
Marathon – 2:07:48 (2012)

References

Living people
1981 births
Japanese male long-distance runners
Japanese male marathon runners
Olympic male marathon runners
Olympic athletes of Japan
Athletes (track and field) at the 2012 Summer Olympics
World Athletics Championships athletes for Japan
Japan Championships in Athletics winners
20th-century Japanese people
21st-century Japanese people